How Do You Say I Don't Love You Anymore was Freda Payne's second American album (following a release in Sweden with Don Gardner) released May 28, 1966. although regarded primarily as a jazz album, there are also several covers of pop songs featured, including the Beatles' hit "Yesterday," "Let It Be Me," the Righteous Brothers' "You've Lost That Lovin' Feelin'," "Feeling Good," and "If You Love Me (Really Love Me)."

On 'Let It Be Me,' the bluesy treatment takes over. 'Yesterday' is delivered in approved pop standard style. Miss Payne is a versatile and polished performer who understands a lyric.

The album was reissued on CD on March 31, 2009 by Poker Records. The reissue contains a biographical essay of Payne's life and career by Mick Patrick (written in December 2008).

Track listing

Album credits
Produced by: Tom Wilson
Arranged and conducted by: Benny Golson

CD reissue credits
CD release conceived and produced by: Dave Timperley and Mick Patrick
Thanks to: Paul Robinson, Jon Roberts, Anna Dueweke, Leee Puddefoot, Kevin Phelan
Special thanks to: David Cole of "In the Basement" (www.basement-group.co.uk)
Labels and memorabilia courtesy of: Dave Timperley
Mastered by: Nick Robbins at Sound Mastering Ltd.
Package designed by: Jane Vallero at Blue Line Design Ltd. (www.blueline-design-co.uk)

1966 albums
Freda Payne albums
Albums produced by Tom Wilson (record producer)
MGM Records albums
Albums conducted by Benny Golson
Albums arranged by Benny Golson